Musmanno is a surname. Notable people with the surname include:

John Musmanno (born 1942), American judge
Michael Musmanno (1897–1968), American jurist, politician, United States Navy admiral, and writer